Sola is a municipality and a Seaside resort in Rogaland county, Norway. It is located in the traditional district of Jæren. The administrative centre of the municipality is the village of Solakrossen. Other villages include Tananger, Hålandsmarka, Sørnes, and Stenebyen. Stavanger Airport is located in Sola, just a short distance from the large Stavanger/Sandnes metropolitan area.

The  municipality is the 342nd largest by area out of the 356 municipalities in Norway. Sola is the 41st most populous municipality in Norway with a population of 27,568.

With usually ample supplies of wind and waves, the sandy beaches are a popular place for windsurfing.

General information

The municipality of Sola was established in 1930 when the old municipality of Håland was split into Sola (south of the Hafrsfjorden) and Madla (north of the Hafrsfjorden). Initially, Sola had 3,372 residents.  On 1 January 2017, a small  area on the southwestern edge of the village of Solakrossen was transferred from Sandnes municipality to Sola.

Name
The municipality (originally the parish) is named after the old Sola farm, since the first Sola Church was built there. The name is very old and the meaning is unknown, although it contains the Norse word sól which translates as Sun, therefore it could have some link to the sun. Historically, the name was also spelled Sole.

Coat of arms
The coat of arms was granted on 1982. The arms show two silver or white waves on a blue background. The arms symbolize all of the sandy beaches along the ocean in the municipality.

Churches
The Church of Norway has four parishes within the municipality of Sola. It is part of the Tungenes prosti (deanery) in the Diocese of Stavanger.

Geography

The municipality of Sola lies on the west side of the Stavanger Peninsula, south of the Hafrsfjorden. The island of Rott lies just off the western coast of Sola. The Fladholmen Lighthouse lies just off shore of the village of Tananger in northern Sola.

History
{{Historical populations
|footnote = Source: Statistics Norway.
|shading = off
|1951|5025
|1961|7075
|1971|9898
|1981|12673
|1991|15982
|2001|19023
|2011|23350
|2020|27153
}}
According to Snorre Sturlason the Battle of Hafrsfjord took place in the year AD 872, probably outside Ytraberget. Harald Fairhair, the first king of Norway, is celebrated for having united Norway at this notable battle.

The stone crosses at Tjora date from about the year 1150. In early Christian times, these stone crosses were used as gathering points for religious ceremonies before churches were built. Sola Church Ruins (Sola ruinkirke) is the ruins of a Romanesque stone church dating from about the year 1120. The stone church probably replaced an older wooden church in the area. This wooden church was possibly the one that Erling Skjalgsson had built when he converted to Christianity at the end of the 10th century. Sola Church overlooked the Hafrsfjord and was in use until 1842.The artist Johan Bennetter (1822–1904) used the church as a studio and lived there with his family. During World War II, most of the church was demolished. It was later reconstructed, and the restoration was finished in 1995.

Stavanger Airport, Sola was founded in 1937. At Sola airport, the first opposed landing by paratroopers took place as German Fallschirmjägers from 1st battalion of the 1st Regiment, 7th Flieger Division were dropped on the airfield. Sola Air Station became an important airfield for the Germans during World War II.

Government
All municipalities in Norway, including Sola, are responsible for primary education (through 10th grade), outpatient health services, senior citizen services, unemployment and other social services, zoning, economic development, and municipal roads. The municipality is governed by a municipal council of elected representatives, which in turn elect a mayor.  The municipality falls under the Sør-Rogaland District Court and the Gulating Court of Appeal.

Municipal council
The municipal council of Sola is made up of 41 representatives that are elected to four year terms. Currently, the party breakdown is as follows:

 Museums 
Museums in Sola include:
 The Aviation History Museum
 Rogaland Krigshistorisk Museum, a World War II museum
 Kystkultursamlingen i Tananger'', a Maritime collection

Notable people 

 Andrew Lawrenceson Smith (ca.1620 - ca.1694) a Scottish craftsman, woodcutter and painter from the Stavanger renaissance
 Andreas Meling (1839 in Sola – 1928) ship owner, politician, Mayor of Stavanger from 1893
 Rasmus Sørnes (1893 in Sola – 1967) an inventor, clockmaker, radio technician; made advanced astronomical clocks
 Tor Sørnes (1925 in Sola – 2017) author, politician, engineer; invented the VingCard
 Bjørn Bue (1934 in Sola – 1997) a Lutheran missionary, Bishop of Stavanger, 1986 to 1997
 Håkon Rege (born 1955) a Norwegian politician and Mayor of Sola 1999 to 2011
 Finn Øglænd (born 1957) an author, poet, and literature critic; grew up at Tananger
 Svein Fjælberg (born 1959 in Sola) former footballer with 128 caps with Viking FK and 33 with Norway
 Rita Eriksen (born 1966 in Sola) & Frank Eriksen (born 1961 in Sola) musicians with Eriksen, a roots, country, blues band
 Solveig Horne (born 1969) a politician and Minister of Children and Families, lives in Sola
 Camilla Herrem (born 1986 in Sola) a handball player with 262 caps with Norway women and three Olympic team medals (Gold in London 2012, Bronze in Rio 2016 and in Tokyo 2020)

References

External links
 
 
 
 Municipal fact sheet from Statistics Norway 

 
Municipalities of Rogaland
1930 establishments in Norway
Seaside resorts in Norway
Jæren